Ali Akdemir (born June 3, 1963 in Sivas) is a Turkish University Professor for Management and former Rector of the Çanakkale Onsekiz Mart University (Gallipoli). He is the former Dean of the Biga Faculty Of Economics and Administrative Sciences (BIIBF) at Çanakkale Onsekiz Mart University (Gallipoli). His  main research area is on management and leadership issues, has some several articles and presentations. 

Prof. Akdemir was Chairman of the World Universities Congress in Canakkale and is editor of the Journal of Administrative Sciences.

References

1963 births
Living people
Turkish business theorists
Turkish social scientists
Turkish non-fiction writers
Rectors of universities and colleges in Turkey
Academic staff of Çanakkale Onsekiz Mart University